The Basque Culinary World Prize is an annual global award co-founded by the Basque Government and the Basque Culinary Center in 2016. A prize of €100,000 is granted to a chef whose work has a wider socio-economic benefit. The winner is to use the prize to devote to a project of their choice that demonstrates the wider role of gastronomy in society.

The award is open to anyone with a professional background in cooking– regardless of their culinary culture or nationality– and whose work has made an impact in the fields such as innovation, technology, education, the environment, health, the food industry and social and economic development.

History  

The prize was co-founded by the Basque Government under the Euskadi-Basque Country Strategy and Basque Culinary Center (BCC), a higher education institution entirely dedicated to developing the economic and social potential of gastronomy.

Previous winners 

The first Basque Culinary World Prize was awarded in 2016 to María Fernanda Di Giacobbe from Venezuela, for her Cacao de Origen initiative – a network involving education, entrepreneurship, research and development around cocoa as a source of identity, culture and economic wealth in Venezuela. Through this network, the chef brought opportunities to financially vulnerable women, building capacities and empowering them; allowing them to become micro-entrepreneurs in the chocolate industry.

In 2017, the prize was awarded to Colombian chef Leonor Espinosa, for her Funleo project – a foundation which helps indigenous and afro-Colombian communities to identify, defend, and promote gastronomic traditions as a way of driving social and economic change.

The 2018 prize was awarded to Scottish-Australian chef Jock Zonfrillo, for his work in connecting indigenous communities in Australia to the rest of society by creating a market for their culinary heritage. His Orana Foundation works to preserve the sophisticated cooking knowledge and practice of indigenous Australians and promote the significance of these practices to a wider Australian audience.
The most recent prize, in 2019, was awarded to US chef Anthony Myint, who runs the Zero Foodprint and Perennial Farming Initiative. The ventures explore the cross-section between restaurants and the environment, by advising food businesses on viable options to reduce their carbon footprint, and even go carbon neutral. He has worked with the State of California on the Restore California programme, which arms suppliers and consumers with transparent information on the environmental footprint of restaurants so they can make better-informed decisions. All restaurants on the list can either be carbon neutral or support local farmers to remove carbon dioxide from the atmosphere.

References 

Food and drink awards
Awards established in 2016
2016 establishments in the Basque Country (autonomous community)
Basque culture